Lyubov Mikhailovna Gurina (born 6 August 1957 in Matushkino, Kirov Oblast) is a retired middle-distance runner who represented the USSR, the Unified Team, and later Russia. Competing mainly in the 800 metres, in 1994 she became the oldest European Champion at the age of 37. In addition, she co-holds the world record in the rarely contested 4 × 800 metres relay, with 7:50.17 set in 1984.

Gurina is a three-time World Athletics Championships medallist in the 800 metres, with silvers in 1983 and 1993, and bronze in 1987. She also competed at two Olympic Games

International competitions

Personal bests
800 metres - 1:55.56 min (1987)
1500 metres - 4:02.47 min (1994)

See also
List of World Athletics Championships medalists (women)
List of European Athletics Championships medalists (women)
List of European Athletics Indoor Championships medalists (women)
List of masters athletes
800 metres at the World Championships in Athletics

References

Sporting  Heroes

1957 births
Living people
Sportspeople from Kirov Oblast
Soviet female middle-distance runners
Russian female middle-distance runners
Olympic female middle-distance runners
Olympic athletes of the Soviet Union
Olympic athletes of the Unified Team
Athletes (track and field) at the 1988 Summer Olympics
Athletes (track and field) at the 1992 Summer Olympics
Goodwill Games medalists in athletics
Competitors at the 1986 Goodwill Games
World Athletics Championships athletes for the Soviet Union
World Athletics Championships athletes for Russia
World Athletics Championships medalists
European Athletics Championships winners
European Athletics Championships medalists
European Athletics Indoor Championships winners
Russian Athletics Championships winners
USA Indoor Track and Field Championships winners
World record holders in masters athletics
World Athletics record holders (relay)